Where It Is is the debut album by British new wave band The Beloved, first released as a vinyl LP in October 1987 on the Flim Flam Productions label. For the initial LP release, a limited number of the albums included a free 7" EP included with purchase (containing three demos: "Forever Laughing", "Falling on My Face" and "The Last Detail"). The album was then reissued on CD in early 1988 as an expanded edition with a more chronological track order and four bonus tracks: an extended remix of the track "Forever Dancing", the original 1986 version of "If Only", "A Kiss Goodbye" from the Happy Now EP and "If Only '88" (a re-recording of the track "If Only" specifically for the CD version).

It was the only album the band released as a new wave, guitar-oriented quartet before the line-up halved and they transitioned to a house/alternative dance sound. It is mostly considered to be a compilation album (including by the band themselves), since it complies most of the singles and related B-side tracks the band released between April 1986 and June 1987, along with tracks from the Happy Now EP (albeit with one, "Righteous Me", being a re-recording). The album was produced by New Order's engineer Michael Johnson, except for "Forever Dancing" and "If Only '87", which were produced by the band themselves. All of the singles made the Top 30 on the UK Indie Chart, but failed to reach the UK Top 75. It didn't chart on the UK Albums Chart, but it reached Number 17 on the UK Indie Chart.

The album was remastered and re-released on 31 January 2020 as a 2-CD set by New State Music. This edition features other B-side tracks not included on the original versions and a second disc of demos and alternate versions of tracks. This release has charted at Number 88 on the UK Albums Chart so far.

Track listings 
All tracks written by all four band members except where noted.

Original LP release (1987)

CD re-release (1988)

2CD 'Special Edition' remaster (2020)

Personnel

Band
Jon Marsh - Vocals, Keyboards
Steve Waddington - Guitar
Tim Havard - Bass
Guy Gausden - Drums

Production
Michael Johnson: production except "Forever Dancing" and "If Only"
The Beloved: production on "Forever Dancing", "If Only", "Having Fun", "The Last Detail", "Grin", "Disgrace", "Privacy (Sometimes)", "The Flame '84", "Seppuku Glory", "Falling On My Face", "Each & Every Time", "Forever Laughing", "If You Ever Change Your Mind" and "On The Fence"
The Journey Through: production on "The Flame '83"

Staff
Five Point: sleeve
Phil Nicholls: photographs (taken in Paris, France, June 1987)

References

1987 debut albums
The Beloved (band) albums